Fulvio Fabrizio Rossi Ciocca (born 30 September 1970) is a Chilean politician and physician.

External Links
 BCN Profile

Living people
1970 births
Chilean physicians
Pontifical Catholic University of Chile alumni
Socialist Party of Chile politicians
21st-century Chilean politicians
People from Iquique
Members of the Chamber of Deputies of Chile